Opus Atlantica is a Swedish power metal band. It is a project of Pete Sandberg a prominent Swedish singer, who has participated in the creation of at least 20 full-length albums. Additionally, Jonas Reingold, a notable Swedish bassist who has also been involved with such bands as Time Requiem and The Flower Kings, is also a band member. The band claims influences from heavy metal, opera and traditional hard rock, resulting in its neo-classical sound.

Line-up
Pete Sandberg–vocals
Johan Reinholdz–guitars
Jonas Reingold–bass, keyboards
Jaime Salazar–drums
Robert Engstrand–keyboards

Discography
 Opus Atlantica (2002)

External links
Opus Atlantica at Regain Records

Swedish power metal musical groups
Musical groups established in 2001